Ludwigswinkel is a municipality in the district of Südwestpfalz of the German state of Rhineland-Palatinate, very close to the French border.  The nearest large town is Pirmasens.

References

Palatinate Forest
South Palatinate
Südwestpfalz